Silence is a 1972 novel by the British writer James Kennaway. His last novel, it was published posthumously.

References

Bibliography
 Trevor Royle. Macmillan Companion to Scottish Literature. Macmillan, 1984.

1972 British novels
Novels by James Kennaway
Jonathan Cape books
Novels published posthumously